Frank Lawton Mokeley (30 September 1904 – 10 June 1969) was an English actor.

His parents were stage players Daisy May Collier and Frank Lawton (I). His first major screen credit was Young Woodley (1930). In the mid-1930s, Lawton appeared in some Hollywood films, most significantly as the adult David Copperfield in MGM's classic literature adaptation of David Copperfield (1935). However, Lawton never made his big breakthrough in Hollywood and returned to British film and theatre.

He was married to actress Evelyn Laye from 1934 until his death in 1969 aged 64. They acted together several times, including in the TV series My Husband and I.

During World War II, he joined the British Army in the Kings Royal Rifle Corps and rose to the rank of major. He was assigned as a liaison officer to the U.S. Army and ultimately was awarded the Legion of Merit, Degree of Legionnaire for his service.

In the West End, he appeared in Alex Atkinson's Four Winds (1953) and Ronald Miller's Waiting for Gillian (1954).

Filmography

References

External links

1904 births
1969 deaths
English male film actors
20th-century English male actors